Max Franklin Urick (born c. 1940) is a former American football coach and college athletics administrator.  He served as the head football coach at Wabash College in Crawfordsville, Indiana for four seasons, from 1967 until 1970, compiling a record of 11–22–2. Urick was the athletic director at Iowa State University from 1983 to 1993 at Kansas State University from 1993 until his retirement in 2001.

Head coaching record

References

1940s births
Living people
American football centers
American football linebackers
Duke Blue Devils football coaches
Iowa State Cyclones athletic directors
Ohio State Buckeyes football coaches
Ohio Wesleyan Battling Bishops football players
Kansas State Wildcats athletic directors
Wabash Little Giants football coaches
Ohio Wesleyan Battling Bishops men's lacrosse players
People from Miami County, Ohio